Biomass is a term used in several contexts: in the context of ecology it means living organisms, and in the context of bioenergy it means matter from recently living (but now dead) organisms. In the latter context, there are variations in how biomass is defined, e.g. only from plants, or from plants and algae, or from plants and animals. The vast majority of biomass used for bioenergy does come from plants. Bioenergy is a type of renewable energy with potential to assist with climate change mitigation.

Uses in different contexts

Ecology 
 Biomass (ecology), the mass of living biological organisms in a given area or ecosystem at a given time. This can be the biomass of particular species or the biomass of a particular community or habitat.

Energy 
 Biomass (energy), biomass used for energy production or in other words: biological mass used as a renewable energy source (usually produced through agriculture, forestry or aquaculture methods)
 Bioenergy, energy sources derived from biological material 
 Solid fuel, forms of bioenergy that are solid
 Biofuel
 Energy crops

Biotechnology 
Biomass is also used as a term for the mass of microorganisms that are used to produce industrial products like enzymes and medicines.

Bioproducts 
Examples of emerging bioproducts or biobased products include biofuels, bioenergy, biochar, starch-based and cellulose-based ethanol, bio-based adhesives, biochemicals, bioplastics, etc.

Biological wastewater treatment 
In biological wastewater treatment processes, such as the activated sludge process, the term "biomass" is used to denote the mass of bacteria and other microorganisms that break down pollutants in wastewater. The biomass forms part of sewage sludge.

Others 
 Biomass (satellite) - an Earth observation satellite

References